FBI Special Weapons and Tactics Teams are specialized part-time tactical teams (SWAT) of the Federal Bureau of Investigation (FBI). The FBI maintains SWAT teams at each of its 56 field offices throughout the United States. Each team is composed of a varying number of certified SWAT operators, dependent on office size and funding.

History 
The Firearms Unit at the FBI Academy began developing SWAT teams in the early 1970s. Following the Wounded Knee Occupation in 1973, the FBI established a regional SWAT program to organize SWAT teams and provide qualified command personnel.

Roles 

FBI SWAT teams are specially trained to serve warrants and intervene in high-risk incidents such as active shooters, barricaded suspects, or protection for personnel or dignitaries. 

FBI SWAT teams are trained to a national standard and utilize the same equipment which enables a team to provide assistance to another Field Office Team. SWAT teams can be dispatched to aid local law enforcement with limited resources to manage large-scale high-risk incidents.

Several factors can determine the deployment of FBI SWAT. Some of those factors are:
The potential of violence
The potential risk to law enforcement and the public
The location of the warrant service and case requirements

SWAT Operations Unit 
The SWAT Operations Unit (SOU), part of the Critical Incident Response Group, oversees the FBI SWAT program. The SOU is responsible for developing standardized training, procedures and tactics, and for research and development including equipment, for the SWAT teams to ensure interoperability for multiple-office deployments. During multiple-office deployments the SOU provides planning assistance and oversight. SWAT teams train on average 32 hours a month.

Enhanced SWAT teams 
Nine FBI SWAT teams are designated as "Enhanced" SWAT teams and are specially trained to be able to assist/augment the full-time national Hostage Rescue Team if needed. Enhanced SWAT teams are typically located at larger field offices and comprise a larger number of personnel than standard teams, in addition to having increased access to additional tactical equipment and methods.

Equipment

Weapons 
FBI SWAT is known to use the M4 carbine, Heckler & Koch MP5/10, Remington 870, Remington 700, various Glock models (17 Gen4, 19M, 20), SIG Sauer P226, and Springfield Armory 1911 Professional Custom. 

FBI SWAT also uses ballistic shields, stun grenades, enforcer battering rams, sledgehammers, Halligan bars, and gas masks, among other equipment.

Vehicles 
FBI SWAT uses a variety of armored SWAT vehicles, including the Lenco BearCat, Humvee, various MRAP models, and occasionally tracked armored personnel carriers. A variety of civilian-style vehicles are also used when necessary (such as to avoid attention), often unmarked SUVs, vans, or pickup trucks produced by subsidiaries of Ford, General Motors, and Stellantis.

In popular culture
In film and television, FBI SWAT appears in films such as Face/Off (1997), The Town (2010), S.W.A.T.: Firefight (2011), and S.W.A.T.: Under Siege (2017), and television shows such as FBI and Criminal Minds.

FBI SWAT also appears in several video games, such as SWAT 4 (2005), Payday 2 (2013), Tom Clancy's Rainbow Six Siege (2015), Tom Clancy's Ghost Recon Wildlands (2017), Tom Clancy's Ghost Recon Breakpoint (2019), and Ready or Not (2021).

References

External links

FBI official website
FBI Tactical Operations webpage (Archived)

Federal Bureau of Investigation
Police tactical units